
Year 329 (CCCXXIX) was a common year starting on Wednesday (link will display the full calendar) of the Julian calendar. At the time, it was known as the Year of the Consulship of Constantinus and Constantinus (or, less frequently, year 1082 Ab urbe condita). The denomination 329 for this year has been used since the early medieval period, when the Anno Domini calendar era became the prevalent method in Europe for naming years.

Events 
 By place 
 China 
 The Han Zhao dynasty, a Southern Xiongnu state during the Sixteen Kingdoms, ends.

 By topic 
 Religion 
 Roman restrictions on joining the clergy are initiated.

Births 
 Gregory Nazianzus, Greek Patriarch of Constantinople (d. 390)

Deaths 
 Han Huang, Chinese general and rebel
 Liu Xi, Chinese emperor of Han Zhao
 Liu Yao, Chinese emperor of Han Zhao
 Liu Yin, Chinese prince of Han Zhao
 Wen Jiao, Chinese general and governor

References